This is a list of properties and historic districts in Oregon that are listed on the National Register of Historic Places.  There are listings in all of Oregon's 36 counties.

The National Register of Historic Places recognizes buildings, structures, objects, sites, and districts of national, state, or local historic significance across the United States. Out of over 90,000 National Register sites nationwide, Oregon is home to more than 2,000 NRHP listings.

Over one-fourth of the NRHP listings in the state are found in Multnomah County. In turn, the large majority (over 90%) of Multnomah's NRHP sites are situated within the city of Portland.

Current listings by county
The following are approximate tallies of current listings by county.

See also
Historic preservation
History of Oregon
National Register of Historic Places
List of National Historic Landmarks in Oregon
Lists of Oregon-related topics

Notes

References

External links

Oregon Parks and Recreation Department, National Register Program
National Park Service, National Register of Historic Places site

 
 
Oregon